Call Me by Your Name is a 2017 coming-of-age romantic drama film directed by Luca Guadagnino. Its screenplay, by James Ivory, who also co-produced, is based on the 2007 novel of the same title by André Aciman. The film is the final instalment in Guadagnino's thematic "Desire" trilogy, after I Am Love (2009), and A Bigger Splash (2015). Set in 1983 in northern Italy, Call Me by Your Name chronicles the romantic relationship between a 17-year-old, Elio Perlman (Timothée Chalamet), and Oliver (Armie Hammer), a 24-year-old graduate-student assistant to Elio's father Samuel (Michael Stuhlbarg), an archaeology professor. The film also stars actresses Amira Casar, Esther Garrel, and Victoire Du Bois.

Development began in 2007 when producers Peter Spears and Howard Rosenman optioned the rights to Aciman's novel. Ivory had been chosen to co-direct with Guadagnino, but stepped down in 2016. Guadagnino had joined the project as a location scout, and eventually became sole director and co-producer. Cinematographer Sayombhu Mukdeeprom used 35 mm film, as opposed to employing digital cinematography. The filmmakers spent weeks decorating Villa Albergoni, one of the main shooting locations. Guadagnino curated the film's soundtrack, which features two original songs by American singer-songwriter Sufjan Stevens.

Sony Pictures Classics acquired distribution rights to Call Me by Your Name before its premiere at the 2017 Sundance Film Festival on January 22, 2017. The film began a limited release in the United States on November 24, 2017, and went on general release on January 19, 2018. It received widespread critical acclaim, particularly for Ivory's screenplay, Guadagnino's direction, Mukdeeprom's cinematography, and the performances of Chalamet, Hammer, and Stuhlbarg. The film garnered a number of accolades, including many for its screenplay, direction, acting, and music. It received four nominations at the 90th Academy Awards, including Best Picture and Best Actor for 22-year-old Chalamet (the third-youngest nominee in the category), and winning for Best Adapted Screenplay. The screenplay also won at the 23rd Critics' Choice Awards, 71st British Academy Film Awards, and the 70th Writers Guild of America Awards.

Plot
In the summer of 1983, Elio Perlman, a 17-year-old Jewish Italo-French boy, lives with his parents in rural Northern Italy. Elio's father, a professor of archaeology, invites a 24-year-old Jewish American graduate student, Oliver, to live with the family over the summer and help with his academic paperwork. Elio, an introspective bibliophile and a musician, initially thinks he has little in common with Oliver, who appears confident and carefree. Elio spends much of the summer reading, playing piano, and hanging out with his childhood friends, Chiara and Marzia. During a volleyball match, Oliver touches Elio's back but Elio brushes it off. However, Elio later finds himself jealous upon seeing Oliver pursue Chiara.

Elio and Oliver spend more time together, going for long walks into town, and accompanying Elio's father on an archaeological trip. Elio is increasingly drawn to Oliver, even sneaking to Oliver's room to smell his clothing. Elio eventually confesses his feelings to Oliver, who tells him they cannot discuss such things. Later, in a secluded spot, the two kiss for the first time. They do not speak for several days.

Elio goes on a date with Marzia and the two have sex. Elio leaves a note for Oliver to end their silence. Oliver writes back, asking Elio to meet him at midnight. Elio agrees and they sleep together for the first time. After, Oliver says to Elio, "Call me by your name and I'll call you by mine". The morning after, Elio cries about how little time he and Oliver have left together. Marzia confronts Elio after not hearing from him for three days. He responds coldly.

As the end of Oliver's stay approaches, Elio's parents, who appear to be aware of the bond between the two, recommend that he and Oliver visit Bergamo together before Oliver returns to the U.S. They spend three romantic days together. Elio, heartbroken after Oliver's departure, calls his mother and asks her to pick him up from the train station and take him home. Marzia is sympathetic to Elio's feelings and says she wants to remain friends. Elio's father, observing his deep sadness, tells him he was aware of his relationship with Oliver and confesses to having had a similar relationship in his own youth. He urges Elio to learn from his grief and grow instead of moving on too quickly.

During Hanukkah, Oliver calls Elio's family to tell them he is engaged to be married to a woman he has been seeing for a few years. An upset Elio calls Oliver by his name and Oliver responds with his; Oliver also says that he remembers everything. After the call, Elio sits down by the fireplace and stares into the flames, tearfully reflecting, as his parents and staff prepare the holiday dinner.

Cast

Styles and themes
Call Me by Your Name is the final installment in a thematic trilogy Guadagnino calls his "Desire" trilogy; the other two parts were I Am Love (2009) and A Bigger Splash (2015). Guadagnino described his approach to the film as "lighthearted and simple", marking a departure from his previous work, which has been called "highly stylised [and] dazzling". Guadagnino considers Call Me by Your Name a "homage to the fathers of my life: my own father, and
my cinematic ones", referring to the filmmakers Jean Renoir, Jacques Rivette, Éric Rohmer, and Bernardo Bertolucci, who he says inspired him.

Guadagnino has described Call Me by Your Name as a family-oriented film for the purpose of "transmission of knowledge and hope that people of different generations come to see the film together." He saw it not as a "gay" movie but as a film about "the beauty of the newborn idea of desire, unbiased and uncynical", reflecting his motto of living "with a sense of joie de vivre". "We should always be very earnest with one's feelings, instead of hiding them or shielding ourselves," he said. He considered it an "uplifting film" about "being who you want to be and finding yourself into the gaze of the other in his or her otherness."

The director tried to avoid the flaws he had seen in most coming-of-age films, where growth is often portrayed as being a result of resolving preconceived dilemmas such as an enforced choice between two lovers. He also wanted the story to follow two people "in the moment", rather than focus on an antagonist or a tragedy—an approach inspired by À nos amours (1983), directed by Maurice Pialat. As someone who considers sex in film a representation of the characters' behavior and identity, Guadagnino was not interested in including explicit sex scenes in the film. He explained his intention: "I wanted the audience to completely rely on the emotional travel of these people and feel first love... It was important to me to create this powerful universality, because the whole idea of the movie is that the other person makes you beautiful—enlightens you, elevates you."

Alongside a sexual coming of age motif, the movie also touches upon the novel's theme of Elio discovering and connecting to his Jewish identity through the openly Jewish Oliver and as a contrast with his own family being, as his mother puts it, "Jews of discretion". The common Jewish identity is a part of what draws Elio and Oliver together and is represented visually on screen through the Star of David necklace that Oliver initially wears and Elio is drawn to. The theme of sexual self-discovery is paralleled with the Jewish theme in the movie, since in both cases, Elio starts out more secretive about these parts of himself and transitions to a place of greater self-acceptance, both journeys connected to Oliver's role in his life. There is a hint in the movie that Oliver might have gifted his own Star of David necklace to Elio shortly before they parted ways in the train station. Elio's own necklace can be clearly seen during the conversation from which the movie (as the novel) borrows its title thanks to its visually central placement during this scene.

Production

Development

Two of the film's producers, Peter Spears and Howard Rosenman, saw a galley proof of André Aciman's debut novel Call Me by Your Name in 2007 and "optioned" the screen rights before its publication. Rosenman first heard about the book through a friend after acting in Milk (2008) and described it as "divine". Spears, moved by the novel and believing it deserved a cinematic adaptation, received his first credit as a producer from his work on the film. They invited their friend James Ivory to work as an executive producer on the film adaptation. Spears and Rosenman began production in 2008, but the project was soon trapped in "development hell". The producers met with three sets of directors and writers—among them Gabriele Muccino, Ferzan Özpetek, and Sam Taylor-Johnson—but could not find anyone who would commit to the project. Scheduling filming in Italy during the summer also proved difficult.

The producers contacted Guadagnino, their first choice to direct, but he declined, citing a busy schedule. However, as Guadagnino lived in northern Italy, he was initially hired as a location consultant instead. Guadagnino later suggested that he co-direct the film with Ivory, but no contractual agreement was put in place. Ivory accepted the offer to co-direct on the condition that he would also write the film; he spent "about nine months" on the screenplay. Guadagnino, who has described the novel as "a Proustian book about remembering the past and indulging in the melancholy of lost things", collaborated on the adaptation with Ivory and Walter Fasano. Screenwriting took place at Ivory's house, Guadagnino's kitchen table in Crema, and sometimes in New York City. Ivory rarely met Guadagnino during the process, since the director was busy making A Bigger Splash (2015).

The screenplay was completed in late 2015. Aciman approved it and commended the adaptation as "direct ... real and persuasive", adding "they've done better than the book". The completed screenplay was vital in securing funding for the film. Among the financiers were the production companies La Cinéfacture (France), Frenesy Film Company (Italy, owned by Guadagnino), M.Y.R.A. Entertainment (United States), RT Features (Brazil), and Water's End Productions (United States). The project was also supported by the Italian Ministry of Cultural Heritage and Activities and Tourism. The backers deemed the production's initial cost estimates "too expensive", so the production budget was reduced from $12 million to $3.4 million and the filming schedule was cut from 12 to 5 weeks.

Ivory stepped down from a directorial role in 2016, leaving Guadagnino to direct the film alone. According to Ivory, financiers from Memento Films International did not want two directors involved with the project because they "thought it would be awkward ... It might take longer, it would look terrible if we got in fights on the set, and so on." Guadagnino said Ivory's version would have likely been "a much more costly [and] different film" that would have been too expensive to make. Ivory became the sole-credited screenwriter and later sold the rights to the screenplay to Guadagnino's company. Call Me by Your Name was Ivory's first produced screenplay since Le Divorce (2003) and the only narrative feature he has written but not directed. He remained involved with other aspects of the production. Guadagnino dedicated the film to his late friend Bill Paxton, who came to visit the set in Crema before his death in February 2017.

Adaptation

The film differs from its source material in several ways. The novel is written in flashback, from Elio's perspective. The filmmakers set the movie entirely in 1983 to help the audience understand the characters, believing that this approach would allow them to remain true to the spirit of the book. The setting was changed from Bordighera to the countryside of Crema, where Guadagnino lives. The town square selected for filming differed from the one Aciman had pictured in his novel, which in his vision was "far smaller and stood high on a hill overlooking a windswept Mediterranean". The arid climate and "spookily deserted" landscape in Crema suggested to him that the film would not correspond to the novel. The director also changed the year of the events from 1987 to 1983. In his words, Guadagnino chose "the year—in Italy at least—where the '70s are killed, when everything that was great about the '70s is definitely shut down," but also a time when the characters could be "in a way untouched by the corruption of the '80s—in the U.S., [Ronald] Reagan, and in the UK, [Margaret] Thatcher".

Guadagnino was tempted to remove the scene in which Elio masturbates into a pitted peach, finding it too explicit. Chalamet was also nervous about the scene, describing it as "a metamorphosis of some of the strongest ideas in the movie" and the key to illuminating the character's "overabundant sexual energy". Both Guadagnino and Chalamet believed it was implausible to masturbate with a peach, but each independently tested the method. To their surprise, it worked, so Guadagnino shot the scene and ultimately included it in the film. A scene featuring Elio and Oliver dancing enthusiastically to The Psychedelic Furs song "Love My Way" in a small bar is not drawn from the book. It was inspired by Jonathan Demme's Something Wild (1986), and Guadagnino's experience of dancing by himself when he was young. Ivory altered Mr. Perlman's profession from a classics scholar to "an art historian/archeologist type", a decision that Aciman described as "perfect" and "more visual, [...] more exciting, as opposed to what a scholar does at his desk".

When he was revising Ivory's draft of the script, Guadagnino removed the voice-over narration and much of the nudity. He said that explicit nudity was "absolutely irrelevant" to his vision for the film, and that he did not like the idea of having the main character tell the story retrospectively, stating that "it kills the surprise". Towards the end of the novel, the two protagonists visit Rome, a trip which lasts an entire chapter and introduces new characters in multiple locations. Because of the film's limited budget, Ivory and the producers wrote several variations, one of which was to leave the lead characters alone in the family's house. Ultimately, the filmmakers settled on another trip—to Bergamo, rather than Rome—where the characters spend much of their time alone together in a hotel room. In his original script, Ivory depicted Elio's parents discussing HIV/AIDS in two scenes, and Elio decorating a Christmas tree in his family's home in the final scene. Ivory had to reduce the length of Mr. Perlman's speech but was committed to keeping it in the script. Aciman said in an interview with Moment that, while keeping intervention with the script at a minimum, he suggested to Ivory to keep dialogue prior to Perlman's speech to a minimum so as not to "steal the surprise and the suspense that happens" as it unfolds. Ivory described the scene in which Elio conveys his feelings to Oliver as one of the moments that captures the "euphoric passion and nervousness" of their first love. Aciman was surprised by Guadagnino's final scene where Elio is seen crying by the fireplace; he wrote of the film adaptation:

Many of the changes to Ivory's screenplay were made during the filming; the screenwriter was not present at the shooting set. In May 2016, Ivory said that he and Guadagnino discussed how to film the scenes involving nudity, but the director later dropped them. In Ivory's view, some of the director's statements to the press had misrepresented the film's omission of nudity as a "conscious aesthetic decision", even though they had never discussed removing nudity from the screenplay. Ivory said, "When people are wandering around before or after making love, and they're decorously covered with sheets, it’s always seemed phoney to me." By contrast, Ivory cited scenes from his earlier film Maurice (1987)—a gay romantic drama that includes male nudity—as "a more natural way of doing things than to hide them, or to do what Luca did, which is to pan the camera out of the window toward some trees." Guadagnino said that he understood Ivory's position, but that it was clear that there were "no limitations on what we wanted to do."

Casting
In 2015, Shia LaBeouf and Greta Scacchi were reportedly set to be cast in the film. In September 2016, Ivory confirmed they were no longer involved in the project. Ivory said he got along with LaBeouf, who had read for the film in New York City, but the production company later felt the actor was unsuitable after his "various troubles". Ivory thought Scacchi and LaBeouf read well together and could have made it into the film, but the company disagreed.

Guadagnino was impressed by Armie Hammer's performance in The Social Network (2010), describing him as a "sophisticated actor, with a great range". Hammer almost turned down the role of Oliver after reading the draft script because it contained nudity, saying, "There's a lot of stuff here that I've never done on film before. But there's no way I can't do this [film], mostly because it scares me so much." Hammer had previously played gay characters in J. Edgar (2011) and Final Portrait (2017).

In 2013, Swardstrom—Spears' husband and agent—introduced Chalamet to Guadagnino, who immediately felt the actor had "the ambition, the intelligence, the sensitivity, the naivety, and the artistry" to play Elio. Chalamet had already read Aciman's novel and described it as "a window into a young person". His character, 17-year-old Elio, is fluent in three languages: English, French and Italian. Upon his arrival in Italy, Chalamet—who already spoke French fluently and had played piano and guitar for years—prepared for his role with a schedule of daily lessons in Italian, gym workouts three times a week, and by working with composer Roberto Solci.

Michael Stuhlbarg, who was cast as Elio's father, Mr. Perlman, did not read the book until he had already joined the production. He found the script moving and described Mr. Perlman as having a "sense of generosity and love and understanding". Esther Garrel was contacted by Guadagnino when he was in Paris for the promotion of A Bigger Splash. Garrel was cast as Marzia without any formal audition, and she chose not to read the book before shooting. Towards the end of the film, Marzia asks Elio, "Friend for life?"—a line taken from J'entends plus la guitare (1991), directed by the actress's father, Philippe Garrel. "I like the idea of talking virtually with Philippe Garrel through her," Guadagnino said. During shooting, Garrel spoke French with Chalamet on set and watched the American sitcom Friends with English subtitles to improve her English.

Guadagnino chose Amira Casar, whom he had known for twenty years, for the role of Elio's mother Annella. In an interview with French magazine Télérama, Guadagnino expressed his admiration of Casar's "sense of transgression" and called her "the most audacious" in European art cinema. Casting director Stella Savino met Vanda Capriolo when she was bicycling in the countryside. Capriolo, who was not an actor, was chosen to play Mafalda, the Perlmans' maid. Aciman and Spears also appear briefly in cameo roles as Mounir and Isaac, an openly gay couple who attend a dinner party. Aciman was asked to be in the movie after actors became unavailable. "It was a last-minute decision," Spears recalled, "André turns out to be a phenomenal actor! So comfortable, not nervous at all. His wife was sitting there and said, 'I had no idea!'" In dialogue, the characters switch between English, French, Italian, and in one scene Annella reads a German translation of 16th-century French literature.

Hammer and Chalamet both signed contracts prohibiting the film from showing them with full-frontal nudity. Ivory, whose original screenplay contained nudity, was dismayed by the decision. He criticized what he saw as an "American" attitude, saying, "Nobody seems to care that much or be shocked about a totally naked woman. It's the men." Guadagnino picked actors based on their performances and chemistry rather than on their sexuality. He said, "The idea that you have to cast only someone who has a certain set of skills, and worse, a certain gender identity in any role: that's oppressive to me."

Production design and costume
The main location set for the Perlmans' residence was Villa Albergoni, an uninhabited 17th-century mansion in Moscazzano. Guadagnino wanted to buy the house but could not afford it, so he made a film there instead. A landscape designer was hired to construct an orchard in the mansion's garden. A pergola was built on the patio, and apricot and peach trees were placed in the garden.

Guadagnino did not want the film to be a period piece and tried to resist making a film that would reflect "our idea of the 80s". His goal was an accurate recreation of the period that was invisible to the viewer." The crew, including production designer Samuel Deshors and set decorators Sandro Piccarozzi and Violante Visconti di Modrone, styled the house with furniture and objects inspired by the characters. Much of the furniture, including dishes and glassware from the 1950s, belonged to Guadagnino and Visconti di Modrone's parents. Di Modrone, a grandniece of Luchino Visconti from the famous Visconti family said, "That made it cozy and personal ... I wanted to give it the sense of time passing by". Many paintings, maps, and mirrors influenced by Asian art came from an antiques shop in Milan. The books seen in the background were all published before 1982. The swimming pool used in the film was based on a watering trough common in the area.

The filmmakers set up faded political billboards in public places to reflect the Italian general election in 1983 and re-created a newsstand full of magazines of that time. Residents of Crema helped the production team with their research, inviting them into their homes and providing pictures from the 1980s. Chen Li, the film's graphic designer, created a handwritten typeface for the film's title sequence of photocopied images of statues alongside items on Mr. Perlman's desk.

Costume designer Giulia Piersanti avoided using period costumes; instead, she wanted to provide "a sense of insouciant adolescent sensuality, summer heat and sexual awakening" to the characters. The costumes, which were influenced by the French films Pauline at the Beach (1983), A Tale of Springtime (1990) and A Summer's Tale (1996), included some pieces made by Piersanti's team. For the Perlmans' wardrobe, Piersanti took inspiration from her parents' photograph albums. For Oliver's "sexy, healthy American" image, Piersanti referred to "some of Bruce Weber's earliest photographs". Oliver's clothes change throughout the film as "he's more able to free himself". Aiming to emphasize Elio's confident style, she chose several Lacoste costumes and a distinctive, New Romantic-looking shirt in the final scene. For Elio's other costumes, Piersanti picked some items from her husband's closet, including the polo shirt and Fido Dido T-shirt.

Principal photography

Principal photography began on May 9, 2016, and wrapped in June 2016, lasting around 33 days. The film was shot primarily in Crema and the surrounding province of Cremona. An unusual series of rainstorms coincided with the shooting schedule, with heavy rain on 28 of the shooting days. Scenes set in the nearby villages Pandino and Moscazzano were filmed between May 17 and 19, and shooting in Crema began on June 1. Additional outdoor scenes were shot on December 4, 2016. The City of Crema invested €18,000 in the film, including a publicity campaign costing €7,500.

The arch of Torrazzo at Crema Cathedral and several historical locations in the streets of Crema and Pandino were chosen during production. Businesses requested compensation for financial losses caused by the closure, which was scheduled for May 30 and 31. Two days' filming at the cathedral were postponed due to the rainy weather. Filming also took place in the Lodigiano area near Crespiatica and in two small towns near Crema, Montodine and Ripalta. The archaeological discovery scene was filmed at the Grottoes of Catullus in Sirmione on the Brescian shores of Lake Garda. The train station scenes were filmed at Pizzighettone. Because of security concerns, the production team was only granted permission to film at the Cascate del Serio in Valbondione for half an hour.

Before and during filming, the actors lived in Crema and were able to experience small-town life. Guadagnino engaged with the cast and filmmakers and often cooked for them and showed films at his house. Hammer and Chalamet, who did not have to do a screen test together, met for the first time during production in Crema. Before filming began, they spent a month together, watching TV and going to local restaurants. "We'd hang out with each other all the time, because we were pretty much the only Americans there, and we were able to defend one another and really get to know one another," Chalamet said. During the first two days of production, Guadagnino read the script with the cast. The first scene that Hammer and Chalamet rehearsed was the kissing scene, and they spent several days filming nude. "I've never been so intimately involved with a director before. Luca was able to look at me and completely undress me," Hammer said.

Guadagnino shot the film in chronological order, which allowed the filmmakers to "witness the onscreen maturity of both protagonist and actor", according to Fasano. The scene in which Mr. Perlman delivers an emotional speech to Elio was filmed on the penultimate day of filming. Stuhlbarg spent months preparing for the scene, which Guadagnino wanted to make "as simple as possible" by shooting fewer takes and "let[ting] the actors be." The scene took three takes to film and Stuhlbarg was "on three different levels of getting emotional". Garrel enjoyed filming her sex scene with Chalamet, which she described as filled with "joy and simplicity". Chalamet was listening to "Visions of Gideon", one of the original songs written by Sufjan Stevens for the film, in an earpiece while filming the final sequence; the director asked him to perform three variations of the scene, one per take. The camera was set in the fireplace with nobody behind it. "It was bit of an acting experiment," Chalamet said. During this scene, the title of the film was shown for the first time, rather than in the opening sequence.

At the Piazza Vittorio Emanuele, a memorial to the victims of the battle of the Piave in Pandino, the filmmakers laid a long camera dolly track to film the scene where Elio tells Oliver of his feelings for him in a single long take. This provided the flexibility and "flow of emotion" a cut scene could not. During the dancing sequence, Hammer had to perform to a click track in front of 50 off-camera extras with the music turned down so the dialogue could be recorded. In preparation for the scene, Guadagnino arranged for Hammer to practice with a dance coach. Hammer said that it was "the worst scene" he had ever filmed. Choreographer Paolo Rocchi, who was contacted by the Frenesy Film Company in June 2016, described the routine as "awkward and realistic". Rosenman considered the scene one of the most emotional moments; he said "It embodied and encapsulated, for me, what teenage love is all about, what desire is all about."

Sayombhu Mukdeeprom, who had previously collaborated with Guadagnino on Ferdinando Cito Filomarino's Antonia (2015), served as the director of photography. He had read Aciman's novel before receiving the script and walked around filming locations to "get a feeling for everything ... to see the color, to see how the light changed during the day, and input it into my data". Mukdeeprom had to use artificial lighting to capture the Northern Italian summer atmosphere, compensating for heavy rains that lasted throughout the shoot. While filming the confrontation scene between Oliver and Elio, Mukdeeprom cried in a corner of the room after they finished the first take, overwhelmed by a feeling of profound empathy for the actors. The film was shot using 35 mm celluloid film and a single lens, a decision influenced by the work of David Cronenberg to "solidif[y] the point of view" and make "the tension of the performance come off the screen"—even if it meant increasing the production budget above the cost of shooting in digital. Guadagnino praised Jean-Pierre Laforce, the film's sound designer and mixer, for his "wonderful" and "pivotal" contributions. Guadagnino, who had previously worked with Laforce on A Bigger Splash, said he was "able to create a sort of Cathedral of sound without overwhelming the movie."

Post-production
Fasano collaborated with Guadagnino during the post-production. They had worked together for 25 years since Guadagnino's debut feature The Protagonists (1999). Fasano described working with Guadagnino as "atypical [and] very demanding, but it's a great experience." Post-production took only a month, between June and July—the fastest they had ever edited. Fasano cited the films of Bernardo Bertolucci and the "fast and unexplained" storytelling in Pialat's À nos amours as inspiration.

Their first cut of the film ran three hours and 20 minutes long. Fasano described it as his favorite saying it made him "lose [him]self in the story and the images." The final cut lasts two hours and 10 minutes with a shooting ratio of 25:1.

Several notable changes were made, or almost made, near the end of post-production. The monologue sequence with Elio's father once had piano playing beneath it. The scene where the two protagonists bike to a courtyard almost failed to make the final cut after one of the producers said it was inconsequential. Hammer revealed that some scenes were digitally altered to fix wardrobe malfunctions caused by his short shorts. Guadagnino has discussed several scenes that did not make the final cut. There was a "well-acted" scene where Elio and Oliver were "teasing one another" under a lime tree, which the director felt was "too precious". A scene where Elio's parents make love in the bedroom while Elio and Oliver are kissing under the moonlight in the garden was also cut. The latter scene was shown at a screening in Castiglioncello in June 2018, which also included a deleted scene of Elio inviting Oliver to tour the village.

Music

Guadagnino selected the music for Call Me by Your Name himself. He wanted to find an "emotional narrator to the film" through music, in a "less heavy, less present, and more enveloping" way than voice and text. The films Barry Lyndon (1975), The Magnificent Ambersons (1942), and The Age of Innocence (1993) inspired him. Guadagnino wanted the film's music to be connected to Elio, a young pianist who enjoys transcribing and adapting piano pieces and uses music to deepen his relationship with Oliver. Music is used in the film to reflect the period setting, the characters' family life and their level of education, and "the kind of canon they would be a part of". Guadagnino also researched which pop songs had been played frequently on local radio stations that summer.

Impressed by the lyricism of American songwriter Sufjan Stevens, Guadagnino asked him to record an original song for Call Me by Your Name and to narrate the film from the perspective of Elio at an older age. Stevens declined the voiceover role but contributed three songs to the soundtrack: "Mystery of Love", "Visions of Gideon", and a remix by Doveman of his song "Futile Devices" from The Age of Adz (2010). Stevens was inspired by the film's script, the novel and conversations with Guadagnino about the characters. He submitted the songs a few days before filming began. Surprised by the result, Guadagnino listened to them on-set with the actors and editor Walter Fasano. The project marked the first time Stevens had written songs explicitly for a feature-film soundtrack. Next to the music of Stevens, a number of classical music pieces and pop songs of the 1980s are included in the soundtrack.

A soundtrack album was released in digital formats by Madison Gate Records and Sony Classical on November 3, 2017, and in physical formats on November 17, 2017. It features songs by: Stevens, The Psychedelic Furs, Franco Battiato, Loredana Bertè, Bandolero, Giorgio Moroder, Joe Esposito, and F. R. David, as well as music by John Adams, Erik Satie, Ryuichi Sakamoto, Bach, and Ravel.  the soundtrack has sold 9,000 copies and had 29 million on-demand audio streams of its tracks in the United States, according to Nielsen SoundScan.

Release
Call Me by Your Name had its world premiere on January 22, 2017, at the Sundance Film Festival. Prior to, international distribution rights were purchased by Memento Films International, a French company that showed the promo reel at the American Film Market in November 2016. Shortly before the film's premiere, Sony Pictures Classics acquired worldwide distribution rights for $6 million. The deal was negotiated by WME Global and UTA Independent Film Group. The film was screened at the Berlin International Film Festival on February 13, 2017; the Toronto International Film Festival on September 7, 2017; and the New York Film Festival on October 3, 2017. At the Beijing International Film Festival, it was originally scheduled for April 2018, but was removed from the official program with no explanation; Patrick Brzeski of The Hollywood Reporter wrote that the decision reflected the government's "consistent stance of intolerance toward gay content". That year, the film was honored at the Crema Film Festival: Aciman met the public on June 23, and Garrel joined the screening at the Crema Cathedral on June 30.

Call Me by Your Name opened in limited release in the United Kingdom on October 27, 2017, and the United States on November 24, 2017. It expanded from four to thirty locations in the U.S. on December 15, 2017, then to 114 theaters on December 22. It screened in 174 theaters in January 2018, before going into wide release in 815 theaters a few days before the Oscar nomination announcement ceremony on January 19, 2018. On Oscars weekend, the film screened in 914 theaters, its widest release in the U.S.

Warner Bros. Entertainment theatrically released the film in Italy on January 25, 2018, though home media distribution in Italy is distributed through Sony Pictures Home Entertainment as well. Special screenings and a public meet-and-greet with Guadagnino, Hammer and Chalamet took place in Crema between January 27 and 30. The film opened in Brazil on January 18 and in France on February 28. In March 2018, a distributor in Tunisia reported that the Ministry of Culture had banned the film as an "attack on liberties" because of its subject matter. In Ireland, it became the longest-running film shown at the Light House Cinema in early June 2018, after a 30-week run. In the Philippines, the film was screened accompanied by a live performance of its soundtrack by the Manila Symphony Orchestra on October 28.

Walt Disney Studios Motion Pictures theatrically released the film in Taiwan on January 12, 2018 under the Buena Vista International label.

Marketing

Sony Pictures Classics released an official poster for Call Me by Your Name on July 27, 2017. The first theatrical trailer was released on August 1, 2017. On October 11, 2017, Sony Pictures Classics released a teaser titled "Dance Party" to celebrate National Coming Out Day. The 42-second clip, consisting of a single take of Hammer and Chalamet dancing to "Love My Way" in a bar, became a meme on Twitter. Because of its use in the clip, "Love My Way" gained popularity on music-streaming websites. It rose 13% on on-demand streams during the two months before the film's release. In the week ending November 30, 2017, the song collected 177,000 on-demand streams, its biggest streaming week in the U.S.

Reaction to the advertisement on social media was somewhat negative, largely because of Sony Pictures' misleading use of an image of Chalamet and Garrel instead of a focus on the protagonists' relationship. Daniel Megarry of Gay Times described it as "an attempt to 'straight-wash' the movie's predominant same-sex romance". Benjamin Lee of The Guardian called the ad a "disastrous attempt to push Oscar-buzzed Call Me by Your Name as a straight love story", and said the advert "belies an industry awkwardly denying queerness". Sony Pictures Classics later aired several commercial spots to promote the film during its U.S.-wide expansion on January 19, 2018. To promote the film in South Korea, Sony Pictures released several never-before-seen set photos and pastel promotional posters illustrated by Son Eunkyoung in March 2018.

Home media
A pirated copy of an awards-screener DVD of Call Me by Your Name, along with copies of Last Flag Flying and fellow Oscar nominees I, Tonya and Lady Bird, were leaked onto file-sharing websites by the hacker group Hive-CM8 on December 24, 2017. The film was officially released for digital download on February 27, 2018. It was released on Blu-ray and DVD on March 13, 2018, with two bonus featurettes ("In Conversation with Armie Hammer, Timothée Chalamet, Michael Stuhlbarg & Luca Guadagnino" and "Snapshots of Italy: The Making of Call Me by Your Name"), an audio commentary track by Chalamet and Stuhlbarg, and the music video for "Mystery of Love". The film made $2,100,758 in DVD sales and $1,856,909 in Blu-ray sales in the United States, for a total of $3,957,667 in home media sales. In the United Kingdom, the DVD charted at number seven and the Blu-ray at number four on Top 100 sales for both formats.

Reception

Box office
Call Me by Your Name grossed $18.1 million in the United States and Canada, and $23.8 million in other territories, for a worldwide total of $41.9 million against a production budget of $3.4 million. The film was Sony Pictures Classics' third-highest-grossing release of 2017.

In the United States, Call Me by Your Name began its limited run on November 24, 2017, at The Paris Theater and Union Square Theatre in New York City, and the ArcLight Hollywood and Landmark Theater in Los Angeles. The film made $404,874 in its opening weekend—a per-theater average of $101,219. It was the highest average of 2017—the biggest since the opening of La La Land the previous December—and had the best per-screen opening for a gay romance film since Brokeback Mountain (2005). In its second weekend, the film grossed $281,288, with an "excellent" per-screen average of $70,320. The film expanded to nine theaters in its third weekend, grossing $291,101 for a "solid" $32,345 per-theater average. It earned $491,933 from 30 theaters in its fourth weekend, averaging $16,398. The film expanded to 114 theaters in its fifth week and grossed $850,736, averaging $7,463 per screen. It crossed $6 million in its seventh weekend, earning $758,726 from 115 locations. It grossed $715,559 from 174 theaters in its eighth weekend, averaging $4,185 per screen.

In the film's nationwide release week—its ninth weekend overall—the film grossed $1.4 million from 815 theaters, an under-performance compared to "some of its competition with similar theater counts," according to Deadline Hollywood. The following weekend, after the announcement of its four Oscar nominations, the film's revenues dropped 6 percent to $1.3 million. With a total gross revenue of $9,370,359 by the week of January 23, 2018, Call Me by Your Name was the second-lowest-grossing film among that year's Best Picture nominees. However, the online ticketing company Fandango reported that the film had experienced a 56 percent increase in ticket sales through its service since its Best Picture nomination was announced. Regarding the film's "lagging" box-office performance, Tom Brueggemann of IndieWire commented that Sony Picture Classic "has done an able job so far", and said "at some point the film and the reaction to it is something no distributor can overcome". It grossed $919,926, averaging $1,006, from 914 theaters during the Oscar weekend, and went on to earn $304,228 from 309 theaters in its sixteenth weekend.

Call Me by Your Name opened at number seven in Italy with €781,000 and obtained the best per-theater average of the week. It made €49,170 on February 6 and reached €2 million by the end of the week. It re-entered at number 10 on March 13 by making another €13,731 at the box office.  the film had grossed $3,925,137 in Italy. It attracted 17,152 viewers in France on its first day of screening, with an "excellent" per-theater average of 184 entries. It went on to attract 108,500 viewers in the opening weekend, earning 1,167 viewings—the second-best average that week—and 238,124 viewers in its third weekend.  the film had grossed $2,652,781 in France. In the United Kingdom, the film earned £231,995 ($306,000) from 112 screens in its opening weekend, including £4,000 from previews. After ten days, it had made £568,000 ($745,000), before reaching the $1 million mark (£767,000) in its third weekend.  the film had grossed $2,372,382 in the United Kingdom.

Critical response
At its premiere at the Sundance Film Festival, Call Me by Your Name received a standing ovation. When it screened at Alice Tully Hall as part of the New York Film Festival, it received a ten-minute ovation, the longest in the festival's history. On review aggregator Rotten Tomatoes, the film has an approval rating of 94% based on 363 reviews, with an average rating of 8.7/10. The website's critical consensus reads, "Call Me by Your Name offers a melancholy, powerfully affecting portrait of first love, empathetically acted by Timothée Chalamet and Armie Hammer." It was the best-reviewed limited release and the second-best-reviewed romance film of 2017 on the site. On Metacritic, the film has an average weighted score of 94 out of 100, based on 53 critics, indicating "universal acclaim". It was the year's fifth-best rated film on Metacritic.

Writing for The Hollywood Reporter, Boyd van Hoeij described Call Me by Your Name as an "extremely sensual ... intimate and piercingly honest" adaptation of Aciman's novel and called Chalamet's performance "the true breakout of the film". Peter Debruge of Variety believed the film "advances the canon of gay cinema" by portraying "a story of first love ... that transcends the same-sex dynamic of its central couple". He compared Guadagnino's "sensual" direction with the films of Pedro Almodóvar and François Ozon, and put Call Me by Your Name "on par with the best of their work". David Ehrlich of IndieWire also praised Guadagnino's directing, which he said helped the film "match the artistry and empathy" of Carol (2015) and Moonlight (2016). Sam Adams of the BBC wrote that Stuhlbarg's performance "puts a frame around the movie's painting and opens up avenues we may not have thought to explore", and called it "one of his finest" to date. He extolled the film as one of "many movies that have so successfully appealed to both the intellectual and the erotic since the heydays of Patrice Chéreau and André Téchiné".

Ty Burr of The Boston Globe gave the film three-and-a-half stars, commended the director for "broaden[ing] his embrace of humanity while hitting new heights of cinematic bliss" and said that the film "may be a fantasy but it's one that's lovely and wise." David Morgan of CBS praised the cinematography, production design and costuming for "making a summer in the 1980s palpably alive again." He found Stuhlbarg's character "the most forward-thinking parent in movie history". Richard Lawson wrote that Guadagnino's adaptation "was made with real love, with good intentions, with a clarity of heart and purposeful, unpretentious intellect" and hailed it as a "modern gay classic" in his Vanity Fair review. Chicago Tribunes Michael Phillips was pleased by the "wonderfully paradoxical" visual interests from the director and said Stevens's songs "work like magic on your sympathies regarding Elio's emotional awakening." He praised Hammer's performance as "some of the most easy-breathing and relaxed best work of his career."

The Economist noted the tension "between pain and pleasure" in the film and praised Chalamet, saying that he "evokes so many shades of humanity, portraying a path of youthful self-discovery that is more raw, unhinged, and ultimately honest than many actors could manage". Kate Taylor of The Globe and Mail, who gave the film two-and-a-half stars, also enjoyed Chalamet's effort in capturing "first love and its inevitable heartbreak" and said the "multilingual, almost-pre-AIDS idyll does not stretch credulity ... but it can try the patience". Ken Eisner of The Georgia Straight said that "Guadagnino's lyrical excesses ... can alternate wildly between the poetically incisive and the indulgently preposterous." In a negative review, Kyle Turner of Paste wrote, "The details of the film are too small for anyone, perhaps particularly a queer person, to see," a visual distance that "suggests that the film, in the beginning, is as terrified as Elio initially is. It never gets over that hesitation." Armond White of Out called the movie "craven commercialism" and a "super-bourgeois fantasy" that "exploit[s] the queer audience's romantic needs by packaging them and falsifying them."

Depiction of age gap in a sexual relationship
The film's depiction of a sexual relationship with an age disparity between the characters Elio and Oliver drew commentary and criticism—especially in the United States, where the lowest legal age of consent is higher than in Italy. The 17-year-old Elio was portrayed by Chalamet, who was 21 at the time of filming, while the 24-year-old Oliver was played by Hammer, then 31. Queer Eye host Karamo Brown, criticized the movie as glorifying sexual assault and said, "it looks like a grown man having sex with a little boy." Author Cheyenne Montgomery said she was disturbed that one of the protagonists is portrayed as a boy and the other as a man, saying, "Elio is portrayed very much as a child: He shaves peach fuzz off of his face, he cuddles with his parents, his lines are often kind of bratty and childlike, and he's being played as a sexy romantic partner to a character who's very much being portrayed as an adult." Physicians Renee Sorrentino and Jack Turban wrote in Psychiatric Times:

A feature in The Advocate, an LGBT-interest magazine, drew attention to other narrative films depicting heterosexual relationships with similar or greater age gaps, such as between the teenaged Scarlett and the 33-year-old Rhett Butler in Gone with the Wind.

Accolades

The National Board of Review and the American Film Institute selected Call Me by Your Name as one of the top 10 films of the year. At the 90th Academy Awards, it was nominated for Best Picture, Best Actor (Chalamet), Best Original Song ("Mystery of Love"), and Best Adapted Screenplay, winning the last. Chalamet became the third-youngest Best Actor nominee and the youngest nominee since 1939, and Ivory became the oldest winner in any competitive category. The film received four nominations at the 71st British Academy Film Awards, including Best Film and Best Direction, and won Best Adapted Screenplay for Ivory. At the 75th Golden Globe Awards, it was nominated for Best Motion Picture – Drama, Best Actor – Motion Picture Drama for Chalamet and Best Supporting Actor for Hammer.

The film received eight nominations at the 23rd Critics' Choice Awards; Ivory won Best Adapted Screenplay. The film led the 33rd Independent Spirit Awards with six nominations, winning Best Male Lead for Chalamet and Best Cinematography for Mukdeeprom. At the 24th Screen Actors Guild Awards, Chalamet received a nomination for Outstanding Performance by a Male Actor in a Leading Role. The film won the GLAAD Media Award for Outstanding Film – Wide Release at its 29th ceremony. In Italy, Fasano won Best Editing at the 73rd Nastro d'Argento Awards and 33rd Golden Ciak Awards. The National Board of Review, the Gotham Independent Film Awards and the Hollywood Film Awards each awarded Chalamet with their Breakout Actor Awards.

In a series of articles regarding the best of the 2010s in film, IndieWire ranked Call Me by Your Name as the 18th best film of the decade and Chalamet's performance as the 39th best acting performance. Consequence of Sound ranked the film as the 23rd best of the decade, Rolling Stone ranked it 40th and Little White Lies ranked it 47th.

Fanbase
The film has gained a large international fan base. During the film's festival run, people crossed borders and oceans to be among the first to see the film. In 2018, a book was published by Barb Mirell, who collected stories from fans around the world about what the film meant to them. By early 2018 the film had attracted a following in China among heterosexual women, who perceived it as a Western "boys' love" romance, evidenced by its popularity on the Chinese social network and media database Douban.

After an Italian fan published coordinates of the filming locations, visiting Crema has become something akin to a religious pilgrimage for fans of the film. The city of Crema now offers official tours.

Sequel

Guadagnino has deliberated over the idea of a sequel since the film's premiere at Sundance, when he said he realized the characters "could go beyond the boundaries of the film." In October 2017, he said he hoped to make a sequel in 2020 that might be in the style of François Truffaut's The Adventures of Antoine Doinel series, telling the story of Oliver and Elio as they age. "If I paired the age of Elio in the film with the age of Timothée, in three years' time, Timothée will be 25, as would Elio by the time the second story was set", he said. In the novel, Elio and Oliver reunite 15 years later when Oliver is married. Guadagnino said that in the sequel, "I don't think Elio is necessarily going to become a gay man. He hasn't found his place yet ... I believe that he would start an intense relationship with Marzia again."

Guadagnino has expressed interest in the politics of the 1990s, saying, "It is the time of the fall of Communism and the start of the new world order and so-called 'end of history' that Francis Fukuyama established then ... the beginning of the [Silvio] Berlusconi era in Italy and it would mean dealing with the [first Gulf War] of Iraq." In November 2017, Guadagnino shared his intention to make a series of five films, in which the audience could "see those actors grow older, embodying those characters." A month later, he was reported to have begun writing a script for a sequel that would reveal more about Oliver and resemble Michael Apted's Up series. Hammer and Chalamet have expressed interest in appearing in a sequel, but Ivory appears to be dismissive, saying about the idea of sequels, "that's fine, good. But I don't know how they're going to get a 40-year-old [Chalamet]!"

In January 2018, Guadagnino revealed the sequel will be set "right after the fall of Berlin Wall and that great shift that was the end of ... the USSR", and that the first scene in the film could depict Elio watching Paul Vecchiali's Once More (1988)—the first French film to deal with AIDS—in a movie theater. In March 2018, Guadagnino confirmed he will work with Aciman on the sequel, which will take place "five or six years afterwards" with "a different tone" than the first film. He also said that Hammer and Chalamet would reprise their roles with a different backdrop, where they "go around the world". Hammer said he was pitched the script by Guadagnino, saying: "it's not a finished script, but he's got all the ideas for it". In April 2018, Aciman said in an interview for The Sydney Morning Herald that he and Guadagnino were "not sure" about the sequel, saying "[Guadagnino] has quite a few projects in line and so do I. So we are flirting with each other about the sequel but I don't know if we are very serious." In July 2018, Stuhlbarg said that Guadagnino and Aciman were excited about the project and that the director was "serious" about it. He expressed enthusiasm to reprise his role in the sequel, saying "I think it would have to be some kind of unique thing from what it was, but I would absolutely be game for trying." Two months later, Hammer said of the sequel in an interview for Variety: "It will happen because there are already people working on it and trying to make it happen."

In an interview for Time in October 2018, Chalamet compared the sequel to Richard Linklater's Boyhood (2014) and said that Hammer, Aciman and Guadagnino were all intended to return for the next film. That same month, Guadagnino revealed that he has asked Dakota Johnson, a frequent collaborator of his, to play Oliver's wife in the sequel. He described her character as "a New England kind of  woman" who might also have children with Oliver. He said that the film would be "a new chapter in a chronicle" about the characters, rather than a sequel, and it might take some time to develop due to the busy schedule, saying "I have not been able to luxuriate in anything but the promotion of Suspiria ... I didn't have space of mind and the real, actual time to put ideas on the table and think of things." "The only problem is the title," he said; "It cannot be Call Me by Your Name Two". At the SCAD Savannah Film Festival in October, Hammer said that Guadagnino had laid out a potential plot for the sequel and it might be a few years away, saying "[Guadagnino] wants to wait so that we age a bit more so that gap makes sense, kind of like a Linklater thing." In an interview with Dazed in November, the director said about the sequel, "It's a delicate flower that is blooming very slowly. And so I think it's not the time to collect it and put it into a vase."

In November 2018, Ivory confirmed that he wouldn't return for the sequel and said that Aciman thought "it was not a good idea". Less than a week later, Aciman, however, said he was in fact writing a sequel to Call Me by Your Name. The novel, titled Find Me, was officially confirmed on March 20, 2019, and was released on October 29 by Farrar, Straus and Giroux. Also in March 2019, Hammer revealed that the film isn't formally in the works, and he hasn't had explicit conversations with either Chalamet or Guadagnino about it. He also felt the potential sequel might not match the expectation, saying "It felt like a really perfect storm of so many things, that if we do make a second one, I think we're setting ourselves up for disappointment. I don't know that anything will match up to the first ... I'm like, 'That was such a special thing, why don't we just leave it alone?'"

In March 2020, Guadagnino confirmed a sequel film in an interview with Italian newspaper la Repubblica. In the interview he also confirmed that the full cast of the original film, including Timothée Chalamet and Armie Hammer will be returning. He also stated in the interview that he was due to meet with an unnamed American writer to discuss the sequel, however it was postponed due to the COVID-19 pandemic. In a GQ interview in September, Hammer was asked again about the film's progress and said, "I've been talking to [Guadagnino], but we haven't got into it. I haven't even read the book. I know Luca hasn't got a full script yet, although he knows what he wants to do with the story, so I don't know how similar or dissimilar it will be to Find Me the novel. I know if we end up doing it, it’s more important for me to focus on Luca’s vision than to focus on Find Me."

A series of allegations against Hammer of emotional abuse and cannibalistic fetishism in early 2021 – resulting in Hammer's removal from nearly all upcoming projects – have raised doubts about the prospects of a sequel, but actor Michael Stuhlbarg hopes that the film will still be made. In May 2021, Guadagnino suggested in an interview with Deadline that a sequel was no longer in his priorities. In the interview, he hinted that, beyond the complications related to Hammer's scandal, Chalamet and himself would be busy with other films in the near future which has led him to put the sequel project aside.

See also 
 List of LGBT-related films
 List of oldest and youngest Academy Award winners and nominees – Youngest nominees for Best Actor in a Leading Role

Notes

References

External links

 
 
 
 

Call Me by Your Name
2017 films
2017 independent films
2017 LGBT-related films
2017 multilingual films
2017 romantic drama films
2010s coming-of-age drama films
2010s erotic drama films
2010s historical romance films
American coming-of-age drama films
American erotic drama films
American multilingual films
American independent films
American romantic drama films
American teen LGBT-related films
BAFTA winners (films)
Bisexuality-related films
Brazilian coming-of-age drama films
Brazilian erotic drama films
Brazilian multilingual films
Brazilian independent films
Brazilian LGBT-related films
Brazilian romantic drama films
Censored films
Coming-of-age drama films
Coming-of-age romance films
English-language Italian films
English-language French films
English-language Brazilian films
Erotic romance films
European Film Awards winners (films)
Films about father–son relationships
Films about LGBT and Judaism
Films based on American novels
Films directed by Luca Guadagnino
Films set in 1983
Films set in Italy
Films shot in Italy
Films whose writer won the Best Adapted Screenplay Academy Award
Films whose writer won the Best Adapted Screenplay BAFTA Award
Films with screenplays by James Ivory
French coming-of-age drama films
French erotic drama films
French independent films
French multilingual films
French LGBT-related films
French romantic drama films
2010s French-language films
Gay-related films
Italian coming-of-age drama films
Italian erotic drama films
Italian multilingual films
Italian independent films
Italian LGBT-related films
Italian romantic drama films
2010s Italian-language films
Juvenile sexuality in films
LGBT-related coming-of-age films
LGBT-related controversies in film
LGBT-related romantic drama films
Male bisexuality in film
Sony Pictures Classics films
Warner Bros. films
Buena Vista International films
2010s English-language films
2010s American films
2010s French films